The 1932 Harvard Crimson football team was an American football team that represented Harvard University as an independent during the 1932 college football season. In its second season under head coach Eddie Casey, the team compiled a 5–3 record and outscored opponents by a total of 169 to 99. Carl H. Hageman, Jr. was the team captain. The team played its home games at Harvard Stadium in Boston.

Schedule

References

Harvard
Harvard Crimson football seasons
Harvard Crimson football
1930s in Boston